Florence Dauta Eshalomi (née Nosegbe; born 18 September 1980) is a British Labour and Co-operative politician serving as the Member of Parliament (MP) representing Vauxhall since 2019. She previously served as the Member of the London Assembly (AM) for Lambeth and Southwark from 2016 to 2021, and represented Brixton Hill on the Lambeth London Borough Council from 2006 to 2018.

Early life
Born Florence Nosegbe in Birmingham, the daughter of Anthony Nosegbe, she is a lifelong Brixton resident and the eldest of three girls from a single parent family. Her mother, the late Maria Da-Silva, worked as a school teacher until her illness forced her to retire early. Florence supported her mother, who suffered from sickle cell anaemia and kidney failure, as her carer.

Eshalomi attended local schools in Lambeth including Durand Primary (now Van Gogh) and St Helen's RC Primary school and Bishop Thomas Grant Secondary School. She completed her A-Levels at St Francis Xavier Sixth Form College in Clapham South. She is the first member of her family to go to university, graduating with a BA Hons in Political & International Studies with Law from Middlesex University. Florence benefited from the EU Funded 'Erasmus Student Exchange' and had the opportunity to study at Utrecht University in the Netherlands.

Eshalomi started her working life as a 16-year-old at Sainsbury's supermarket, Clapham High Street. She has worked in a variety of campaigning and public affairs roles including in local government as a policy officer, as a regional organiser for the Labour Party during the 2005 general election and as the Public Affairs Manager for the UK's leading race equality think tank, the Runnymede Trust.

Political career
Prior to winning her seat on the London Assembly, she worked for the PR agency Four Communications as a public affairs account manager.

Eshalomi served as a local councillor from Brixton Hill on Lambeth London Borough Council. She represented the ward along with future Labour MP Steve Reed.

Eshalomi has previously served as a member of the Progress Strategy Board. In 2016, The Times reported that "one of Momentum's most militant factions" planned to picket an event held to support Eshalomi's candidacy for the London Assembly. MPs including Chuka Umunna, Ben Bradshaw and Stella Creasy strongly criticised the picket, and a spokesperson for Momentum stated that the picket was organised by a separate group and that "Momentum are fully behind Flo's campaign." In the 2015 leadership election Eshalomi supported Liz Kendall to become Labour Party leader.

Eshalomi was elected to the London Assembly on 5 May 2016 with a majority of 62,243 over the Conservative Party candidate Robert Flint. She was lead spokesperson for the London Assembly Labour Group on Transport issues, and current Chair of the London Assembly Transport Committee.

As an Assembly Member, Eshalomi has campaigned on issues including gang crime and the closure of Kennington Police Station.

Eshalomi was selected as Labour candidate for the Vauxhall parliamentary constituency on 27 October 2019, after Kate Hoey, a long-standing MP of 30 years, had announced she would not stand again as Labour's candidate in the constituency. Eshalomi won the seat with a slightly reduced majority of 19,612 votes.

Eshalomi made her maiden speech in the House of Commons on 17 January 2020. She said that "I never imagined that almost five years to the day, as I was literally pacing up and down the maternity ward, looking over the river, trying to coerce my daughter to come out, I would now be sat in this Parliament fighting for funding for our hard-working doctors and nurses" in reference to St Thomas' Hospital in her Vauxhall constituency. Eshalomi also prioritised more funding for the NHS and Police, and to focus on tackling youth violence and young women facing sexual exploitation. On 14 April 2020, Eshalomi was promoted to the opposition front bench as a whip.

Eshalomi and her fellow black female MPs have frequently been mistaken for each other since entering parliament, with Eshalomi herself being twice mistaken for black female colleagues in the nine months since her election. Eshalomi said of the misidentifications that "The frequency is worrying and lends itself to a lazy racist view that all black people look the same". Eshalomi was wrongly identified as Taiwo Owatemi by BBC Parliament and a fellow MP ran up to her thinking she was Kate Osamor. During Eshalomi's time on the London Assembly, she was mistaken for Conservative Kemi Badenoch, then a fellow assembly member. Eshalomi wrote that "All those women I've referenced are individual politicians in their own right...They're women who fought to get elected. So they deserve to be named and not to be confused with other black women. This doesn't happen to some of my white female colleagues, who sometimes have their hair down, sometimes they'll have it back in a ponytail. So why is it, if we as black women change our hair or our appearance, you can't recognise us?"

On 30 December 2020, Eshalomi abstained on the Future Trade Agreement between the UK and the EU, resulting in her resignation as an opposition whip.

In May 2021, Eshalomi returned to the Labour front bench as the Parliamentary Private Secretary (PPS) to Angela Rayner, the Shadow First Secretary of State and Deputy Leader of the Labour Party.

In June 2021, a 59-year-old man from Brixton was prosecuted after sending a stream of abusive messages to Eshalomi between December 2020 and February 2021.

Personal life
Eshalomi married her husband Matthew in 2014. They have two children, who were born at St Thomas' Hospital. She is of Nigerian descent.

Electoral history

2019 general election

2016 London Assembly election

2014 Lambeth London Borough Council election

2010 Lambeth London Borough Council election

References

External links

"Florence Eshalomi MP – Assembly Member", London Assembly.
"Councillor Florence Eshalomi", Lambeth.

Living people
1980 births
21st-century British women politicians
Alumni of Middlesex University
Anti-crime activists
Councillors in the London Borough of Lambeth
Black British women politicians
British expatriates in the Netherlands
British Roman Catholics
English people of Nigerian descent
Female members of the Parliament of the United Kingdom for English constituencies
Labour Co-operative MPs for English constituencies
Labour Co-operative Members of the London Assembly
People from Brixton
Politics of the London Borough of Lambeth
Politics of the London Borough of Southwark
UK MPs 2019–present
Utrecht University alumni
Black British MPs
Women councillors in England